Henrik Per Tallinder (born 10 January 1979) is a Swedish former professional ice hockey defenceman who played in the National Hockey League (NHL) with the Buffalo Sabres and New Jersey Devils.

Playing career 
Tallinder made his professional debut in his native Sweden with AIK IF in the Elitserien during the 1996–97 season. Showing elite potential, Tallinder was drafted 48th overall by the Buffalo Sabres in the 1997 NHL Entry Draft.

After signing with the Buffalo Sabres, Tallinder made his North American debut in the 2001–02 season with AHL affiliate, the Rochester Americans. He was recalled in his first season appearing in 2 scoreless games for the Sabres.

Tallinder suffered a broken left arm in game 3 of the Sabres Eastern Conference finals against the Carolina Hurricanes and missed the remainder of the 2006 Stanley Cup Playoffs.  At the time of the injury, he was tied for the NHL playoff lead in plus/minus at +14.

During the 10th game of the 2006–07 season, Tallinder broke the same arm during a game against the New York Islanders. During a game against New Jersey on 6 February 2008, he became the first Sabres defenceman to score in a shootout, scoring against Martin Brodeur.

On 1 July 2010, Tallinder signed a four-year, $13.5 million contract with the New Jersey Devils.

On 7 July 2013, Tallinder was traded back to the team that drafted him, the Buffalo Sabres in exchange for Riley Boychuk.

In September 2014, Tallinder would sign a tryout with the Toronto Maple Leafs, however, he suffered an injury in a preseason game against his former team, the Sabres, and was ultimately released without a contract. After playing in four games with the New York Rangers AHL affiliate, the Hartford Wolf Pack, Tallinder signalled the end of his North American career in returning to Europe and agreeing to a contract with the ZSC Lions of the NLA.

On October 9, 2018, Tallinder officially announced his retirement after 22 professional seasons.

International play

On 27 December 2009, Tallinder was selected to the Sweden Men's Ice Hockey Olympic team for the February 2010 Winter Olympics in Vancouver, Canada. He later completed in his second Olympics in Sochi, Russia, claiming the silver medal at the 2014 Winter Olympics.

Personal 
In 2005, Tallinder, and fellow Swedish hockey players Kristian Huselius and Andreas Lilja were investigated on suspicion of sexual exploitation. In March 2005, all three players were suspended from the Swedish national team for one year, with Huselius and Tallinder being released by Swedish club Linköping. Lilja was not suspended by Swedish club Mora, but decided to take a break for the remainder of the rest of the season.

Initially police had dropped their investigation within two days 11 February 2005 when a 22-year-old woman accused the trio of raping her 9 February, because of a lack of evidence. However, a special prosecutor reopened the case in March, leading to the suspensions. Tallinder and the others were cleared in June of that year.

, Tallinder has lived in Turku, Finland. He has two children with his Finnish wife Anna.

Career statistics

Regular season and playoffs

International

References

External links 
 

1979 births
AIK IF players
Buffalo Sabres draft picks
Buffalo Sabres players
Hartford Wolf Pack players
Ice hockey players at the 2010 Winter Olympics
Ice hockey players at the 2014 Winter Olympics
Linköping HC players
Living people
Medalists at the 2014 Winter Olympics
New Jersey Devils players
Olympic ice hockey players of Sweden
Olympic medalists in ice hockey
Olympic silver medalists for Sweden
Rochester Americans players
SC Bern players
Ice hockey people from Stockholm
Swedish expatriate ice hockey players in the United States
Swedish ice hockey defencemen
HC TPS players
ZSC Lions players
Swedish expatriates in Finland